Ikon is a band from Melbourne, Australia.  Ikon blends darkwave and post-punk music, following the footsteps of influences such as Joy Division and early New Order.

History
Chris McCarter (vocals, guitar, programming) and Dino Molinaro (bass) began to write songs as high school students in 1988, inspired by their love of alternative music. In 1991, the original band name Death in the Dark was replaced by IKON. The band’s original singer Michael Carrodus joined them in creating the first two albums In the Shadow of the Angel (1994) and Flowers for the Gathering (1996), which drew IKON to the attention of goth music fans in Europe and America through their signing to Apollyon and Metropolis. Music journalist Mick Mercer called them "pioneers in the Gothic genre".

The band continued to evolve in musical style after the departure of Carrodus in 1997. This Quiet Earth (1998) heralded a development in McCarter’s musical composition, spawning popular singles Subversion and Ghost in My Head. While the inclusion of electronic elements on the album shook up some fans of the band’s earlier Joy Division-influenced sound, IKON’s blend of traditional rock with electronics proved original and distinguished them from bands of the era who imitated the first wave of gothic bands.

On the Edge of Forever (2001) ushered in a return to live performance. Drummer David Burns and guitarist Anthony Griffiths (both of whom joined the band in late-1998) were integral to the development of the album, which abandoned the electronic experimentation of This Quiet Earth and returned to IKON’s rock roots.  Nevertheless, DAC charting singles such as The Shallow Sea revealed further nuances to the band’s musical capacities, with its acoustic, dreamy melody. 

The rejuvenated IKON set out on its first European tour in August 2001, the first of eight tours to come, which included a slot at Eurorock and a glimpse of how greatly their music had made an impact on the other side of the world. After this successful tour, the band was invited to play at the M'era Luna festival in 2002, with billing alongside The Sisters of Mercy, HIM, Soft Cell and London After Midnight and then their first of three appearances at Wave Gotik Treffen in 2003.

After this extremely successful period of live international performances, IKON was once again back to original members McCarter and Molinaro, with Clifford Ennis joining the band for the first time. The band released the highly acclaimed Psychic Vampire EP (2004), which became the biggest-selling IKON single to date and marked a transition to a powerful, aggressive rock sound and is a testament to the growth in McCarter’s evolving songwriting, honed during years of touring the world.

The EP proved to be the perfect training run for the composition of one of IKON’s most striking albums, Destroying the World to Save It (2005), which produced chart successes on both the Native 25 (number 21 Best Album of 2005, debut at number 8, May 2005) and DAC (Rome number 10 on the singles chart). The album cemented IKON’s reputation as not only pioneers in the genre but as a potent and current force in a scene in which EBM/Industrial had become predominant.

Love, Hate and Sorrow, IKON’s sixth studio album was released in 2009 and spawned four singles, a DVD single and two video clips. Black Magazin (issue 49) named the first single A Line on a Dark Day the second-best track of 2008 and the song was also named a semi-finalist in the International Songwriting Competition. 

In 2010, IKON welcomed back Ennis and Burns. To celebrate the band’s 20th anniversary, this line-up is touring Europe in 2011, with another scheduled appearance at Wave Gotik Treffen. The band has reissued the sought-after original albums In the Shadow of the Angel and Flowers for the Gathering in 4-disc sets (3 CD + DVD), with a LP of the debut album available on coloured vinyl. Echozone also released 2-CD sets of each album.

The future for IKON promises a new recording with its current energetic and creative 4-piece line-up jamming and developing demos. The band will also continue its suite of album re-issues with This Quiet Earth and On the Edge of Forever to be remastered in 2012. Fans can look forward, then, to a perfect blend of old and new, the classics of IKON’s past and the possibilities of its future.

Discography

Albums
Everyone Everything Everywhere Ends (2014)
Love, Hate and Sorrow (2009)
Destroying the World to Save It (2005)
On the Edge of Forever (2001)
This Quiet Earth (1998)
Flowers for the Gathering (1996) (Reissued 2011)
In the Shadow of the Angel (1994) (Reissued 2011)

Compilation albums
'The Thirteenth Hour the singles 2007-2020' (3CD 2020)
'Sketches and Blurred Visions' 1991-1993 (2CD/DVD 2018)
"As Time Goes By 2CD (re-issue 2018)
'Like Sounds Through the Hour Glass 1991-2017 (2016)As Time Goes By (The Original IKON) (2007) (reissued 2018 2CD)The Burden of History the Singles 1992-2007 2CD (2007)From Angels to Ashes (2003)Dawn of the Ikonoclast 1991-1997 2CD (1999)The Final Experience (1997 limited edition 1500 copies)A Moment in Time (1995)

EPsTorn Apart 2CD (2010)Driftwood (2010)Amongst the Runes (2008)League of Nations (2007)Psychic Vampire (2004)Ghost in My Head (1998)The Echoes of Silence (1994)

 DVD singles
"A Line on a Dark Day" (2010)

Singles
"Silence is Calling" (7"single Australia 2020)
"A Line on a Dark Day" (7"single Australia 2020)
"Ghost in My Head" (7"single Australia 2019)
"As Time Goes By" (7"single Australia 2018)
"I Never Wanted You" (7"/CD single Australia 2016)
"Psychic Vampire" (7"/CD single Australia 2016)
"Gruss Vom Krampus" (7" single Holland 2015)
"Black Noise" (12" single Australia 2016)
"Black Noise" (7"/CD single Australia 2015)
"Blood of Love" (7"/CD single Australia 2015)
"Stolen" (7"/CD single Australia 2014)
"I Burn For You" (7"/CD single Australia 2014)
"Subversion" (7"/CD single Australia 2013)
"Azkadelia" (7"/CD single USA 2012)
"Where Do I Go from Here" (CD single Australia 2011)
"Broken Windows" (12" single/CD single USA 2011)
"Without Shadows" (CD single Australia 2006)
"Rome" (CD single Germany 2005)
"Death by Dawn" (7" Single Germany 2005)
"I Never Wanted You" ( CD single Australia 2004)
"Psychic Vampire" (CD single Australia 2004)
"Ceremony" (CD single Australia 2003)
"Afterlife" (CD single Australia 2002)
"Afterlife" (7" Single Australia 2002)
"Blue Snow Red Rain" (10" Single Germany 2001)
"The Shallow Sea Pt. 2" (CD single Australia 2000)
"The Shallow Sea Pt. 1" (CD single Germany 2000)
"Lifeless" (CD single Germany 1999)
"Reality Is Lost" (CD single 1999)
"Subversion" (CD single Germany 1998)
"Subversion" (CD single USA 1998)
"Life Without End" (CD single Germany 1996)
"In a Lonely Place" (CD single Germany 1995)
"Condemnation" (7" Single Germany 1995)
"The Echoes of Silence" (7" Single Australia 1994)
"Why" (7" Single Australia 1992)

Unofficial releasesBlack Friday (Live at the Blackout Club, Rome, Italy) (2003)Twilight Zone (Live at Eurorock Belgium 2001) (7" Single/2003)Tyranny of Distance (Live in Australia 2002) (2002)A Tale from the Darkside (Live in Berlin 2001) (2001)Black Radio (Live at Esplanade Hotel, Melbourne 1994) (2001)The Trial of Destiny (live in Melbourne 1999) (2000)Secrets Within (rare tracks) (1999)Black Radio (Live at Esplanade Hotel, Melbourne 1994) (12" vinyl LP/1995)Thank You Very Much, Goodnight (Live in Melbourne 1994) (1994)Out of Balance, Out of Tune'' (Live in Melbourne 92/93) (1993)

Members

Current
Chris McCarter (vocals/guitars/programming)
Dino Molinaro (bass)
David Burns (drums)
Clifford Ennis (vocals/guitar)

Former
Michael Aliani (aka Carrodus) (vocals)
Anthony Griffiths (guitars/vocals)
Valerios Calocerinos (bass)
Maurice Molella (drums)
Anthony Cornish (guitar)

References

External links
Official IKON website
IKON on MySpace.com
IKON at Last.fm

Victoria (Australia) musical groups
Australian gothic rock groups
Musical groups established in 1991
Australian dark wave musical groups
Metropolis Records artists
1991 establishments in Australia